Vandopsis lissochiloides is a plant species in the genus Vandopsis, belonging to the orchid family (Orchidaceae), has a unique combination of sharp yellow and toned pinkish back side.

Characteristics 
The robust stem can reach up to 2 m heigh or 80 inches. The leaves are stiff and leathery and up to one feet (30 cm) long. Gently perfumed, those textured flowers are about 7 cm across and last for several months.

Habitat 
It usually grows in the lowlands of the Philippines, but also in Thailand and Laos, and as far as New Guinea.

References

External links 

lissochiloides
Orchids of Laos
Orchids of New Guinea
Orchids of the Philippines
Orchids of Thailand